
Gmina Grabica is a rural gmina (administrative district) in Piotrków County, Łódź Voivodeship, in central Poland.

Villages
Gmina Grabica contains the villages and settlements of Boryszów, Brzoza, Cisowa, Doły Brzeskie, Dziewuliny, Dziwle, Grabica, Gutów Duży, Gutów Mały, Kafar, Kamocin, Kamocinek, Kobyłki Duże, Kociołki, Krzepczów, Lubanów, Lubonia, Lutosławice Rządowe, Lutosławice Szlacheckie, Majdany, Majków Mały, Majków Średni, Majków-Folwark, Maleniec, Olendry, Ostrów, Papieże, Polesie, Rusociny, Szydłów, Szydłów-Kolonia, Twardosławice, Władysławów, Wola Bykowska, Wola Kamocka, Zaborów, Żądło, Żeronie and Żychlin.

Neighbouring gminas
Gmina Grabica is bordered by the city of Piotrków Trybunalski and by the gminas of Bełchatów, Dłutów, Drużbice, Moszczenica, Tuszyn and Wola Krzysztoporska.

References
Polish official population figures 2006

Grabica
Piotrków County